Head over Heels is a 2001 American romantic comedy-thriller film  directed by Mark Waters. The film was panned by critics and failed to recover its modest $14 million budget.

Plot
Amanda Pierce (Monica Potter), a New York paintings conservator at the Metropolitan Museum of Art, has bad judgment in men, which becomes apparent when she finds her boyfriend cheating on her with a supermodel. She looks for a new apartment, and finds one with four struggling models: Jade (Shalom Harlow), Roxana (Ivana Miličević), Candi (Sarah O'Hare) and Holly (Tomiko Fraser).

When Amanda discovers that Jim Winston (Freddie Prinze Jr.), a guy she likes, lives in the apartment across from hers, she starts spying on him to try to find his flaw. One night she sees him kill a woman, Megan O'Brien (Tanja Reichert). However, she is the only witness; and when the police arrive, they find no evidence of the crime.

Annoyed by the police's lack of effort, Amanda and her new friends investigate Jim on their own. When Amanda confronts him, he turns out to be an undercover FBI agent, Bob Smoot, who was trying to gain a suspect's trust by staging his partner Megan's death. Amanda learns that Jim is investigating a Russian named Strukov (Jay Brazeau), who, under the alias of Halloran, has been smuggling money. He is also the client for whom Amanda has been privately restoring a painting.

Strukov captures Jim, Amanda and her roommates; but they escape when Roxana seduces their Russian guard. They discover Strukov is actually smuggling diamonds. They go to a fashion runway, take down Strukov, and receive special commendations from the FBI.

Jim asks Amanda if they can start over, but she refuses and he leaves. However, Amanda and Jim—going by his real name, Bob—"meet" again. He takes her up to his new apartment, from where they can see Amanda's model friends, who are obviously happy that things turned out so well for her.

Cast
 Freddie Prinze Jr. as Jim Winston / FBI Special Agent Bob Smoot
 Monica Potter as Amanda Pierce
 Ivana Miličević as Roxana Milla Slasnakova 
 Shalom Harlow as Jade 
 Sarah O'Hare as Candi 
 Tomiko Fraser as Holly Payton
 China Chow as Lisa 
 Timothy Olyphant as Michael
 Tanja Reichert as Megan O'Brien
 Tanner as Hamlet the Great Dane
 Jay Brazeau as Mr. Halloran / Vadiim Strukov
 Stanley DeSantis as Alfredo 
 Betty Linde as Polly
 Norma MacMillan as Gladys
 Bethoe Shirkoff as Noreen
 Tom Shorthouse as Mr. Rankin
 Joe Pascual as Officer Rodriguez
 J.B. Bivens as Mitch

Reception
The film opened on February 2, 2001, to largely negative reviews, receiving a 10% "Rotten" rating at review aggregator Rotten Tomatoes with an average score of 3.4/10, based on 89 reviews. The website's consensus reads: "Head over Heels is being blasted by critics as a huge mess. The plot and jokes are idiotic, while the toilet humor is gratuitous and more gross than funny." The movie has received a Metacritic aggregate rating of 27 out of 100 reviews, denoting "generally unfavorable reviews" based on 25 reviews. Analyzing the individual performances in the film, Robert K. Elder of the Chicago Tribune wrote: "With her Julia Roberts-like vulnerability and kewpie-doll eyes, Potter certainly outshines Prinze, who doesn't deviate much from his past teen dream roles—though he's winsome just the same.

By most standards, the film was financially unsuccessful. Released on February 2, 2001, the film opened at #7 in 2,338 theaters and grossed $4,804,595 in the opening weekend at the North American box office. The final domestic grossing was $10.4 million while the foreign market grossed $2.7 million for a worldwide total of $13,127,022. Against its $14 million budget, the film was a flop.

References

External links
 
 

2001 films
2001 romantic comedy films
American romantic comedy films
2000s comedy mystery films
2000s English-language films
Films about modeling
Films directed by Mark Waters
Films scored by Randy Edelman
Films scored by Steve Porcaro
Films set in New York City
Films shot in New York City
Universal Pictures films
American comedy mystery films
American female buddy films
2000s American films